Alexander Herbert Nicholls (born Salisbury, 26 June 1961) is a Zimbabwean former rugby union player and coach. He played as prop.

Playing career
At club level, he played for the Mashonaland provincial team. Nicholls also represented Zimbabwe at the 1987 and 1991 Rugby World Cups, with his first international cap being during the pool stage match against Scotland in Wellington, on 30 May 1987 and his last cap being during the match against Japan in Belfast, on 24 October 1991.

Coaching career
Nichols was the caretaker coach of Zimbabwe in 1998. In 2004, he was appointed manager of the Zimbabwe under-19 national team replacing Patrick Gumunyu, after the then-coach Reg Querl was sacked. He also coached Old Hararians RFC.

Personal life
He is the father of Joseph Nicholls and Ben Nicholls, the former being a player for Utah Warriors in the Major League Rugby and the second being a coach for Warriors Selects.

References

External links
Alex Nicholls international stats

1961 births
People from Harare
Zimbabwean rugby union players
Zimbabwean rugby union coaches
Rugby union props
White Zimbabwean sportspeople
Living people